McGlone is an Irish surname. Notable people with the surname include:

Bill McGlone (born 1984), American lacrosse player
Jim McGlone (1897–1985), Australian rules footballer
Joe McGlone (1896–1963), American football player
John McGlone (1864–1927), American baseball player
John J. McGlone (born 1955), American zoologist
Jos McGlone rugby league footballer of the 1920s
Mariam McGlone (1916–2008), American dancer and educator
Matthew McGlone, American academic
Mike McGlone (born 1972), American actor and singer
Patsy McGlone, Northern Irish politician
Samantha McGlone (born 1979), Canadian triathlete
Vince McGlone (1916–2014), New Zealand seaman and television personality

See also
McGlone, West Virginia, an unincorporated community in the United States